Antheraea moultoni is a moth of the family Saturniidae first described by Watson in 1927. It is found in Borneo.

External links

Antheraea
Moths of Borneo
Moths described in 1927